Eric Floyd may refer to:

 Sleepy Floyd (Eric Augustus Floyd, born 1960), American basketball player
 Eric Floyd (American football) (born 1965), American football player